Pratiksha Santosh Shinde (born May 2, 1994, Pune) is an Indian athlete that is chosen to compete in the 2009 Asian Indoor Games and the first World Vovinam Championship. In the dual sword form event of the Indoor Games, Shinde and Akanksha Sahai got India a silver medal. It's also Shinde's third silver coming in fights category. She also participated in the 4th World Traditional Wushu Championship in China Shiyan city 2010. In the World Vovinam Championship, she is ranked number 3.

Early life  

Pratiksha completed her H.S.C  from Garware college of commerce Pune.  Apart from Wushu she 
loves playing football and like Dancing.

She has completed her graduation from Dr. D.Y Patil Institute of hotel management and Catering technology in 2017, also an MBA from Dr. D.Y Patil Global Business School, Pune.

She has also done commentary for Asian Games 2018.

External links 
 Official site at Ho Chi Minh City 
 Wushu Association of India: Results

1994 births
Living people